Río Arriba is a barrio in the municipality of Arecibo, Puerto Rico. Its population in 2010 was 858.

History
Puerto Rico was ceded by Spain in the aftermath of the Spanish–American War under the terms of the Treaty of Paris of 1898 and became an unincorporated territory of the United States. In 1899, the United States Department of War conducted a census of Puerto Rico finding that the population of Río Arriba barrio was 1,709.

Sectors
Barrios (which are roughly comparable to minor civil divisions) in turn are further subdivided into smaller local populated place areas/units called sectores (sectors in English). The types of sectores may vary, from normally sector to urbanización to reparto to barriada to residencial, among others.

The following sectors are in Río Arriba barrio:

, and 
.

Hurricane Maria
On September 27, 2017 it was reported that a week after Hurricane Maria hit Puerto Rico, roads into and out of Río Arriba remained blocked and inaccessible. Residents were clearing the way with machetes and working with rescue crew to evacuate people who needed dialysis and emergency medical help.

Gallery

See also

 List of communities in Puerto Rico
 List of barrios and sectors of Arecibo, Puerto Rico

References

Barrios of Arecibo, Puerto Rico